
The Asian Parliamentary Assembly (APA) aims to promote peace in general, and in the Asian region in particular. It was established as the Association of Asian Parliaments for Peace (AAPP) in September 1999 by Sheikh Hasina, acquiring its current name in 2006 during the Seventh Session of the AAPP. The APA consisted, as of 2007, of 41 Member Parliaments and 17 observers. Each Member Parliament has a specific number of seats in the Assembly based on the size of their population. The number of total seats, and therefore, number of votes, is currently 206. Members of Assembly must be elected by members of the Member Parliaments. The APA Charter and Tehran Declaration lay out a framework of cooperation among Asian countries, and point out to a vision; that is Asian Integration.

The APA differed from its predecessor through a focus on broadening areas of cooperation toward regional integration with the long term perspective to eventually reach the status of an Asian common legislative mechanism. Unlike the AAPP, members of the APA Plenary must be elected by members of member parliaments.

A 2017 standing committee meeting was held in Bhutan. The 10th plenary session, in November 2017 in Istanbul, was on the topic of "Sustaining Peace and Development in Asia".

Membership

In 2007 it consisted of 41 Member Parliaments and 17 observers.

In 2019 it has 42 member parliaments, and 16 observers.

See also
Asia Cooperation Dialogue
Asian Development Bank

References

Bibliography

 AAPP
 APA

External links

Parliamentary assemblies
International organizations based in Asia
Organizations established in 1999